The 20th Century Technology Museum is located in Wharton, Texas, United States, and displays examples of technology from the 20th century. The museum is a non-profit organization and opened its gallery in July 2005 on the first floor of the former Wharton County Jail, which was constructed in 1888.

The museum's collection consists mostly of smaller items, such as radios, but also has a few experimental aircraft, including  an ornithopter and a Rutan VariEze, which is displayed in front of the museum.  Many items on display in the museum are in working condition and may either be demonstrated to visitors or available for hands-on operation (including most of the arcade games on display).

Major displays in the museum include:
Radios
 Phonographs and a jukebox
 Televisions
 Arcade games
 Home appliances, such as early refrigerators
 Farm equipment
 Telephones
 Typewriters
 Computers
 Electronics
 Cameras
 Aircraft

See also
 List of museums in Central Texas
Museum of Radio and Technology
Museum of Broadcast Communications
American Museum of Radio and Electricity

External links
20th Century Technology Museum website

Technology museums in Texas
Museums in Wharton County, Texas
Museums established in 2005
Government buildings completed in 1888
Infrastructure completed in 1888
Telecommunications museums in the United States
Science museums in Texas